The Women's Team Sprint is one of the 7 women's events at the 2009 UCI Track Cycling World Championships, held in Pruszków, Poland.

Ten teams of 2 cyclists each participated in the contest. After the qualifying, the fastest 2 teams raced for gold, and 3rd and 4th teams raced for bronze.

The Qualifying and the Finals were held on the evening session on 26 March.

Qualifying

Finals

References

Women's team sprint
UCI Track Cycling World Championships – Women's team sprint